European Route E 121 is a European A class road in Russia, Kazakhstan and Turkmenistan, connecting the cities Samara - Oral - Atyrau - Beyneu - Türkmenbaşy

Route 

 Samara - Bol'shaya Chernigovka - / border

Oral - Atyrau - Beyneu - Shetpe - Zhetybay

Garabogaz - Türkmenbaşy - Serdar - / border

External links 
 UN Economic Commission for Europe: Overall Map of E-road Network (2007)

International E-road network
E121
E121
Roads in Turkmenistan